In Catholic theology, Limbo (or , referring to the edge of Hell) is the afterlife condition of those who die in original sin without being assigned to the Hell of the Damned. Medieval theologians of Western Europe described the underworld ("hell", "hades", "infernum") as divided into three distinct parts: Hell of the Damned, Limbo of the Fathers or Patriarchs, and Limbo of the Infants. The Limbo of the Fathers is an official doctrine of the Catholic Church, but the Limbo of the Infants is not. The concept of Limbo comes from the idea that, in the case of Limbo of the Fathers, good people weren't able to achieve heaven just because of the fact that they were born before the birth of Jesus Christ. This is also true for Limbo of the Infants in that simply because a child died before baptism, does not mean they deserve punishment, though they cannot achieve salvation.

Limbo of the Patriarchs

The "Limbo of the Patriarchs" or "Limbo of the Fathers" (Latin ) is seen as the temporary state of those who, despite the sins they may have committed, died in the friendship of God but could not enter Heaven until redemption by Jesus Christ made it possible. The term Limbo of the Fathers was a medieval name for the part of the underworld (Hades) where the patriarchs of the Old Testament were believed to be kept until Christ's soul descended into it by his death through crucifixion and freed them. The Catechism of the Catholic Church describes Christ's descent into Hell as meaning primarily that "the crucified one sojourned in the realm of the dead prior to his resurrection. This was the first meaning given in the apostolic preaching to Christ's descent into Hell: that Jesus, like all men, experienced death and in his soul joined the others in the realm of the dead." It adds: "But he descended there as Saviour, proclaiming the Good News to the spirits imprisoned there." It does not use the word Limbo.

This concept of Limbo affirms that admittance to Heaven is possible only through the intervention of Jesus Christ, but does not portray Moses, etc. as being punished eternally in Hell. The concept of Limbo of the Patriarchs is not spelled out in Scripture, but is seen by some as implicit in various references:

 Luke 16:22 speaks of the "bosom of Abraham", which both the Roman Catholic Church and the Eastern Orthodox Church, following early Christian writers, understand as a temporary state of souls awaiting entrance into Heaven. The end of that state is set either at the Resurrection of the Dead, the most common interpretation in the East, or at the Harrowing of Hell, the most common interpretation in the West, but adopted also by some in the East.
 Jesus told the Good Thief that the two of them would be together "this day" in Paradise (Luke 23:43; see also Matthew 27:38); but on the Sunday of his resurrection he said that he had "not yet ascended to the Father" (John 20:17). At least one Medieval devotional source and a course of Catholic religious instruction dating to or before the early 1900s posit the view that the [[(see descent of Jesus Christ to the abode of the dead, his presence among them, turned it into a paradise. Others understand the text to mean not "I say to you, This day you will be with me in paradise", but "I say to you this day, You will be with me in paradise". Timothy Radcliffe explained the "today" as a reference to the "Today of eternity".
 Jesus is also described as preaching to "the spirits in prison" (1 Peter 3:19). Medieval drama sometimes portrayed Christ leading a dramatic assault – the Harrowing of Hell – during the three days between the Crucifixion and the resurrection. In this assault, Jesus freed the souls of the just and escorted them triumphantly into heaven. This imagery is still used in the Eastern Orthodox Church's Holy Saturday liturgy (between Good Friday and Pascha) and in Eastern Orthodox icons of the Resurrection of Jesus.
 The doctrine expressed by the term Limbo of the Fathers was taught, for instance, by Clement of Alexandria, who maintained: "It is not right that these should be condemned without trial, and that those alone who lived after the coming [of Christ] should have the advantage of the divine righteousness."

Limbo of Infants

The Limbo of Infants (Latin  or ) is the hypothetical permanent status of the unbaptised who die in infancy, too young to have committed actual sins, but not having been freed from original sin. Recent Catholic theological speculation tends to stress the hope, although not the certainty, that these infants may attain heaven instead of the state of Limbo. Many Catholic priests and prelates simply say that the souls of unbaptized children must simply be "entrusted to the mercy of God", and whatever their status is cannot be known.

While the Catholic Church has a defined doctrine on original sin, it has none on the eternal fate of unbaptised infants, leaving theologians free to propose different theories, which magisterium is free to accept or reject. Nonetheless, according to Catholic dogma, baptism, or at least the desire for it, along with supernatural faith or at least the "habit of faith", are necessary for salvation. Hence, it is not immediately clear how to reconcile the mercy of God for unbaptized infants with the necessity of baptism and Catholic faith for salvation. Several theories have been proposed. Limbo is one such theory, although the word limbo itself is never mentioned in the Catechism of the Catholic Church. Nonetheless, the theory of limbo has weighty support in the traditional teaching of the Doctors of the Church, such as Saint Thomas Aquinas, Saint Augustine, and Saint Alphonsus Liguori.

Latin Fathers
In countering Pelagius, who denied original sin, Saint Augustine of Hippo was led to state that because of original sin, "such infants as quit the body without being baptized will be involved in the mildest condemnation of all. That person, therefore, greatly deceives both himself and others, who teaches that they will not be involved in condemnation; whereas the apostle says: 'Judgment from one offence to condemnation' (Romans 5:16), and again a little after: 'By the offence of one upon all persons to condemnation'."

The Council of Carthage (418), a council of North African bishops which included Augustine of Hippo, did not explicitly endorse all aspects of Augustine's stern view about the destiny of infants who die without baptism, but said in some manuscripts "that there is no intermediate or other happy dwelling place for children who have left this life without Baptism, without which they cannot enter the kingdom of heaven, that is, eternal life". So great was Augustine's influence in the West, however, that the Latin Fathers of the 5th and 6th centuries (e.g., Jerome, Avitus of Vienne, and Gregory the Great) did adopt his position.

Medieval theologians
In the later Medieval period, some theologians continued to hold Augustine's view. In the 12th century, Peter Abelard (1079–1142) said that these infants suffered no material torment or positive punishment, just the pain of loss at being denied the beatific vision. Others held that unbaptised infants suffered no pain at all: unaware of being deprived of the beatific vision, they enjoyed a state of natural, not supernatural happiness. This theory was associated with but independent of the term "Limbo of Infants", which was coined about the year 1300.

If Heaven is a state of supernatural happiness and union with God, and Hell is understood as a state of torture and separation from God then, in this view, the Limbo of Infants, although technically part of hell (the outermost part, limbo meaning 'outer edge' or 'hem') is seen as a sort of intermediate state.

The Limbo of Infants is there described as an eternal state of natural joy, untempered by any sense of loss at how much greater their joy might have been had they been baptised:

The natural happiness possessed in this place would consist in the perception of God mediated through creatures. As stated in the International Theological Commission's document on the question:

Modern era
The Ecumenical Council of Florence (1442) spoke of baptism as necessary even for children and required that they be baptised soon after birth. This had earlier been affirmed at the local Council of Carthage (417). The Council of Florence also stated that those who die in original sin alone go to Hell, but with pains unequal to those suffered by those who had committed actual mortal sins. John Wycliffe's attack on the necessity of infant baptism was condemned by another general council, the Council of Constance. The Council of Trent in 1547 explicitly stated that baptism (or desire for baptism) was the means by which one is transferred "from that state wherein man is born a child of the first Adam, to the state of grace, and of the adoption of the sons of God, through the second Adam, Jesus Christ, our Saviour. Pope Pius X taught of Limbo's existence in his Catechism.

However, through the 18th and 19th centuries, individual theologians (Bianchi in 1768, H. Klee in 1835, Caron in 1855, H. Schell in 1893) continued to formulate theories of how children who died unbaptised might still be saved. By 1952 a theologian such as Ludwig Ott could, in a widely used and well-regarded manual, openly teach the possibility that children who die unbaptised might be saved for heaven. He also told about Thomas Cajetan, a major 16th-century theologian, that suggested infants dying in the womb before birth, and so before ordinary sacramental baptism could be administered, might be saved through their mother's wish for their baptism. In its 1980 instruction on children's baptism the Congregation for the Doctrine of the Faith stated that "with regard to children who die without having received baptism, the Church can only entrust them to the mercy of God, as indeed she does in the funeral rite established for them", leaving all theories as to their fate, including Limbo, as viable possibilities. In 1984, when Joseph Ratzinger, then Cardinal Prefect of that Congregation, stated that he rejected the claim that children who die unbaptised cannot attain salvation, he was speaking for many academic theologians of his training and background.

The Church's teaching expressed in the 1992 Catechism of the Catholic Church is that "Baptism is necessary for salvation for those to whom the Gospel has been proclaimed and who have had the possibility of asking for this sacrament." It adds that "God has bound salvation to the sacrament of Baptism, but he himself is not bound by his sacraments". It recalls that, apart from the sacrament, "baptism of blood" (as in the case of the martyrs) and in the case of catechumens who die before receiving the sacrament, explicit desire for baptism, together with Catholic faith, repentance for their sins (specifically perfect contrition, in the case of catechumens) and charity, ensures salvation. It states that, since Christ died for all and all are called to the same divine destiny, "every man who is ignorant of the Gospel of Christ and of his Church, but seeks the truth and does the will of God in accordance with his understanding of it, can be saved", seeing that, if they had known of the necessity of baptism, they would have desired it explicitly. In addition, both the Council of Trent and the Vatican's response to Feeneyism in the 1940s, the Church affirmed in every case the necessity of Catholic faith (also called "supernatural faith") or at least the "habit of faith", for salvation.

It then states:

Merely stating that one can "hope" in a way of salvation other than baptism, the Church thus urgently reiterates its appeal to baptize infants, the only certain means to "not prevent" their "coming to Christ" for salvation.

On 20 April 2007, the advisory body known as the International Theological Commission released a document, originally commissioned by Pope John Paul II, entitled "The Hope of Salvation for Infants Who Die without Being Baptized." After tracing the history of the various opinions that have been and are held on the eternal fate of unbaptized infants, including that connected with the theory of the Limbo of Infants, and after examining the theological arguments, the document stated its conclusion as follows:

Pope Benedict XVI authorized publication of this document, indicating that he considers it consistent with the Church's teaching, though it is not an official expression of that teaching. Media reports that by the document "the Pope closed Limbo" are thus without foundation. In fact, the document explicitly states that "the theory of limbo, understood as a state which includes the souls of infants who die subject to original sin and without baptism, and who, therefore, neither merit the beatific vision, nor yet are subjected to any punishment, because they are not guilty of any personal sin. This theory, elaborated by theologians beginning in the Middle Ages, never entered into the dogmatic definitions of the Magisterium. Still, that same Magisterium did at times mention the theory in its ordinary teaching up until the Second Vatican Council. It remains therefore a possible theological hypothesis" (second preliminary paragraph); and in paragraph 41 it repeats that the theory of Limbo "remains a possible theological opinion". The document thus allows the hypothesis of a limbo of infants to be held as one of the existing theories about the fate of children who die without being baptised, a question on which there is "no explicit answer" from Scripture or tradition. The traditional theological alternative to Limbo was not Heaven, but rather some degree of suffering in Hell. At any rate, these theories are not the official teaching of the Catholic Church, but are only opinions that the Church does not condemn, permitting them to be held by its members, just as is the theory of possible salvation for infants dying without baptism.

In other denominations and religions

Neither the Eastern Orthodox Church nor Protestantism accepts the concept of a limbo of infants; but, while not using the expression "Limbo of the Patriarchs", the Eastern Orthodox Church lays much stress on the resurrected Christ's action of liberating Adam and Eve and other righteous figures of the Old Testament, such as Abraham and David, from Hades (see Harrowing of Hell).

Some Protestants have a similar understanding of those who died as believers prior to the crucifixion of Jesus residing in a place that is not Heaven, but not Hell. The doctrine holds that Hades has two "compartments", one an unnamed place of torment, the other named "Abraham's bosom". Luke 16:19–16:26 speaks of a chasm fixed between the two which cannot be crossed. Those in the unnamed "compartment" have no hope, and will ultimately be consigned to hell. Those in Abraham's bosom are those of whom it is written of Jesus, "When He ascended on high, He led captive a host of captives" (Ephesians 4:8), quoting Psalm 68:18). These individuals, the captives, now reside with God in Heaven. Both "Compartments" still exist, but Abraham's bosom is now empty, while the other chamber is not, according to this doctrine.

Latter-day Saints teach that "there is a space between death and the resurrection of the body[...] a state of the soul in happiness or in misery until the time[...] that the dead shall come forth, and be reunited, both soul and body, and be brought to stand before God, and be judged according to their works." It is also taught that "all who have died without a knowledge of [the] gospel, who would have received it if they had been permitted to tarry, shall be heirs of the celestial kingdom of God.".

Jehovah's Witnesses, Christadelphians, and others have taught that the dead are unconscious (or even nonexistent), awaiting their destiny on Judgment Day.

The Zoroastrian concept of hamistagan is similar to Limbo. Hamistagan is a neutral state in which a soul that was neither good nor evil awaits Judgment Day.

During this period, sinners are punished and the adequately purified rest in comfort. Children however are exempt from this stage, as they are regarded as innocent and are automatically classed as Muslims (despite religious upbringing). After death, they go directly to Heaven, where they are cared for by Abraham. Q.7:46) "a residual place or limbo" situated between heaven and hell where there is "neither punishment nor reward".

In Classical Greek mythology, the section of Hades known as the Fields of Asphodel were a realm much resembling Limbo, to which the vast majority of people who were held to have deserved neither the Elysian Fields (Heaven) nor Tartarus (Hell) were consigned for eternity.

In Buddhism, Bardo is sometimes described as similar to limbo. It is an intermediate state in which the recently deceased experiences various phenomena before being reborn in another state, including heaven or hell. According to Mahāyāna Buddhism, the arhat must ultimately embrace the path of the bodhisattva, despite having reached enlightenment. This is likened to a person intoxicated who must spend a certain period of time before becoming sober.

Cultural references

 In the Divine Comedy poem Inferno, Dante depicts Limbo as the first circle of Hell. The virtuous pagans of classical history and mythology inhabit a brightly lit and beautiful – but somber – castle, which is seemingly a medieval version of Elysium. They include Hector, Julius Caesar, Virgil, Electra, and Orpheus. Virtuous non-Christians, such as the Muslims Saladin and Averroes, were also described as among its residents.
 In his novel In the First Circle, Russian writer Aleksandr Solzhenitsyn used Dante's first circle, or limbo for allusion.
 One of Nobel Prize-winning poet Seamus Heaney's best known works is titled Limbo.
 In the Artemis Fowl series, "Limbo" is the timeless plane of existence where the demon fairies are trapped until The Lost Colony.
 In the film Inception, Limbo is a deep subconscious level, far beyond false awakening, and a state in which the characters may be trapped indefinitely.
 In the 1973 adult film The Devil in Miss Jones, the main character Justine Jones who just killed herself by slitting her wrists somehow finds herself in Limbo.
 In The Monster Squad, a 1987 comedy/horror film written by Shane Black and Fred Dekker, the way to defeat the monsters is to open a hole in the universe and cast them into Limbo.
 In The Matrix Revolutions, the third installment of The Matrix series, Neo gets trapped in a train station named Mobil Ave. He learns that the station (located "nowhere") is a sort of borderworld, a passage between the "Matrix" and the "Machine" (the place where the Machines reside in the real) world. Mobil is an anagram of Limbo.
 In the final episode of the BBC time travel/cop show Ashes to Ashes (Series 3, Episode 8), it is revealed that the world that Alex Drake awoke to after being shot, which Sam Tyler described and that other major characters inhabit, is a kind of Limbo, one seemingly specifically for members of the police force, who had died in violent or sudden ways.
 In the indie game Limbo, a boy walks through a black and white world searching for his sister.
 In DmC: Devil May Cry, Limbo is a parallel dimension in which the main setting of Limbo City becomes a demonically influenced version of its real world counterpart. The demons that rule Limbo City can drag their victims into Limbo and manipulate the landscape to create twists and turns to entrap the protagonist, Dante.
 In Marvel Comics, Limbo is the name of 2 dimensions: one is a section outside of time ruled over by a future version of Kang the Conqueror called Immortus, the other is a dimension of demons commonly under the rule of Belasco.
 In DC Comics, Limbo is a dimension inhabited by old characters who have been removed from continuity or seemingly abandoned or forgotten.
 "In Limbo" is the 11th track on Genesis' debut album "From Genesis to Revelation".
 "In Limbo" is the 7th track on Radiohead's 2000 album "Kid A".
 In the BBC CW TV series The Vampire Diaries, a form of limbo called "The Other Side" is created by a powerful witch named Qetsiyah, creating it as a Purgatory for all supernatural (vampires, witches, werewolves, doppelgängers, hybrids, etc.) beings go in death, it prevents any supernatural being from reaching a form of Heaven called "Peace".
 In Warframe, one of the many playable Warframes is named Limbo, who has the ability to travel through a second dimension called the Rift Plane, by tapping into the Void to his advantage against his enemies and in some support to his allies.
 Sitting in Limbo is a song by Jamaican singer/writer/composer/actor Jimmy Cliff, he recorded it at Muscle Shoals Sound Studio in Alabama, USA in 1971, for his album Another Cycle. The song can be heard in the 1972 Perry Henzell's film The Harder They Come as a prophetic musical prelude to Ivan's death, the character played by Cliff himself.
 In the anime/manga Naruto, Limbo is described as an "in-between dimension" which is connected to the real world but cannot be seen by people without the special viewing ability "Rinnegan".
In the anime/manga Inuyasha, Limbo was called the "Border of the Afterlife" which is the demon graveyard uses the Black Pearl, Tekki, the blood that connects to the underworld, and the gateway to the border from the Realm of Fire in Feudal Japan.
In Inuyasha the Movie: Swords of an Honorable Ruler, Toga's third sword So'unga can transport to the border.
In Yashahime: Princess Half-Demon, Moroha will use the Black Pearl to enter the Border of the Afterlife to reunite with her parents.
In the indie game ULTRAKILL, Limbo is described as a part of Hell where everything is calm and peaceful while still being fake. Screens showing clear blue skies and speakers play calm music.

See also

 Intermediate state
 Matarta in Mandaeism
 Shatrin in Mandaeism
 Spirit world (Latter Day Saints)
 Spirits in prison

References

External links

 Vanhoutte, Kristof K.P. (2018) Limbo Reapplied. On Living in Perennial Crisis and the Immanent Afterlife. Cham, Palgrave Macmillan.
 
 The Hope of Salvation for Infants Who Die Without Being Baptized (document of the International Theological Commission)
 Unbaptized Infants Suffer Fire and Limbo Is a Heretical Pelagian Fable(a Traditionalist sedevacantist perspective)

 
Afterlife in Christianity
Afterlife places
Baptism
Catholic theology and doctrine